Bø LORAN-C transmitter is a LORAN-C transmitter at Bø, Norway. Bø LORAN-C transmitter is the X-ray secondary station of the Ejde chain (GRI 9007) and the master station of the Bø chain (GRI 7007). The transmission power of Bø LORAN-C transmitter is 400 kW.

External links
 https://web.archive.org/web/20070930055902/http://home.online.no/~loran-c/boe.html

Transmitter sites in Norway
Bø, Nordland
LORAN-C transmitters in Norway
Military installations in Nordland